

Winners and nominees

1980s

1990s

2000s

Records 
 Most awarded actors: Carlos Espejel, Nayelli Saldívar and Ludwika Paleta, 2 times.
 Most awarded actors (ever winner): Carlos Espejel, Nayelli Saldívar and Ludwika Paleta, 2 times.
 Most nominated actress: Carlos Espejel with 3 nominations.
 Youngest winners: Daniela Luján and Octavio Ocaña, 9 years old.
 Youngest nominee: Daniela Aedo, 6 years old.
 Oldest winner: Pierre Angelo, 16 years old.
 Oldest nominee: and Jose Maria Torre, 15 years old.
 Actress winning after short time: Nayelli Saldívar by (Guadalupe, 1985) and (Esperándote, 1986), 2 consecutive years.
 Actress winning after long time: Ludwika Paleta by (Carrusel, 1990) and (El abuelo y yo, 1993), 3 years difference.
 Actresses that winning the award for the same role: Lucero (Chispita, 1982) and Daniela Luján (Luz Clarita, 1996)
 Foreign winning actress:
 Ludwika Paleta from Poland
 Belinda from Spain

References

External links 
 TVyNovelas at esmas.com
 TVyNovelas Awards at the univision.com

Awards disestablished in 2008
Child Performance
Child Performance
Child Performance
Awards for young actors
Awards established in 1983